Merlin Stone (born Marilyn Jacobson, September 27, 1931 – February 23, 2011) was an American author, artist and academic. She was an important thinker of the feminist theology and Goddess movements and is known for her book When God Was a Woman.

Biography
Merlin Stone was born in Flatbush, Brooklyn, New York. She attended P.S. 217 and Erasmus Hall High School, where she graduated in 1949 with a Metallic Art Medal Award. After enrolling at the University of Buffalo later that year and marrying in 1950, she continued her studies while raising her children, ultimately earning a B.S. and teaching certificate in art (with a minor in journalism) from the institution in 1958. She became interested in archaeology and ancient religions from her study of ancient art.

From 1958 to 1967, she worked as a teacher and sculptor, exhibiting widely and executing numerous commissions. During this period, she was divorced from her first husband in 1963 and taught at Buffalo State College as an assistant professor of art (1962) and her alma mater (by now a SUNY university center) as an assistant professor of sculpture (1966).<ref>According to the author's information on the 1976 Harcourt edition of When God Was a Woman'</ref>

In 1968, she received an interdisciplinary M.F.A. from the California College of Arts and Crafts. While based in Oakland and Berkeley, California from 1967 to 1972, she taught at the University of California, Berkeley's extension program, commenced research into ancient culture in earnest and expanded her practice to include kinetic sculpture, liquid light shows, performance art and collaborations with engineers.

She spent a decade on research before writing the book published in the UK as The Paradise Papers and then in the U.S. as When God Was a Woman (1976). It describes her theory of how the Hebrews suppressed goddess-worshipping religions practiced in Canaan and how their reaction to what she says were existing matriarchial and matrilineal societal structures shaped Judaism and thus Christianity. Her theory builds on the ideas of Robert Graves, but rather than starting from his work, Stone gathered material from the "libraries, museums, universities, and excavation sites of the United States, Europe and the Near East." She observed within these materials "the sexual and religious bias of many of the erudite scholars of the nineteenth and twentieth centuries", and challenges many of their conclusions, raising doubts about the criticisms of Graves's theories.

Her other major work, Ancient Mirrors of Womanhood, collects stories, myths, and prayers involving goddess figures from a wide variety of world religions, ancient and otherwise. Stone's hypotheses are radical and challenging to the accepted views of antiquity. She is the author of numerous short stories, book reviews, and essays, including 3,000 Years of Racism.

Stone's book When God Was a Woman had a profound effect on the international Goddess movement of the 1970s and 1980s. She was featured in the 1989 documentary Goddess Remembered.

After residing in London (1972-1974; 1975) and Quadra Island, British Columbia (1974-1975), she and her life partner, Lenny Schneir, met in Miami Beach, Florida in 1976 while Stone (who had been recently widowed by her second husband) was serving as a caregiver for her father. They lived in New York City until 2005, when they relocated to Daytona Beach, Florida. She was diagnosed with pseudobulbar palsy in 2008 and died of dementia complications in 2011.

 Written works 

 Books 
  Republished as:
  
 
  Reprinted in one volume:
 

 Pamphlets 
 

 Articles 
 
 
 
 
 
 

 Contributions 
 
 "The Great Goddess: Who was She?", "The Three Faces of Goddess Spirituality", and "Ancient Mirrors of Womanhood" in 
 
 "Goddess Worship in the Ancient Near East" published in both  and 
 
 
  
 

 Audio-visual works
 When God Was a Woman, Pacifica Radio, 1978.
 The Return of the Goddess, Canadian Broadcasting Corporation, 1986.
 
 The Voice of Earth (with Olympia Dukakis) at Williams College and the William Carlos Williams Center in 1990.

See also
 After the Development of Agriculture
 Feminist art movement in the United States

References

Sources
 Stone, Merlin, When God Was a Woman'', Harcourt Brace Jovanovich, 1976.

External links
Merlin Stone – official website'

1931 births
2011 deaths
Feminist spirituality
Feminist theologians
20th-century American writers
20th-century American sculptors
Matriarchy
20th-century American women writers
University at Buffalo alumni
21st-century American women
21st-century American sculptors